Shafiqul Islam is a politician from Kishoreganj District of Bangladesh. He was elected a member of parliament from Kishoreganj-7 in February 1996.

Career 
Shafiqul Islam was elected a Member of Parliament from Kishoreganj-7 constituency as an Bangladesh Nationalist Party candidate in the Sixth Parliamentary Election on 15 February 1996.

References 

Living people
Year of birth missing (living people)
People from Kishoreganj District
Bangladesh Nationalist Party politicians
6th Jatiya Sangsad members